Sipunculus nudus is a cosmopolitan species of unsegmented marine worm of the phylum Sipuncula, also known as peanut worms.

Description
As in all peanut worms, the body of S. nudus consists of a sac-like portion called the trunk and an eversible proboscis called the introvert. The mouth is located at the anterior end of the introvert and is surrounded by a group of tentacles.

The epidermis contains a series of longitudinal coelomic canals that are connected to the main coelomic cavity by pores. Below the epidermis there are circular muscles surrounding the body which, as the coelomic canals, are marked on the surface, making the animal's surface be marked by rectangular ridges.

Distribution
The worm hides in sand burrows which it makes by itself during the day and may extend its tentacles out of the burrow to feed at night. Its diet consists of plant or animal tissue fragments and any surrounding sand it may ingest with it.

Recent research indicates that it is a complex of similar species around the world rather than one species, with at least "five distinct lineages identified by phylogenetic analyses".

Uses

The species is collected and sold as a model organism for various fields of science, as fish bait, or for human consumption. It is also sold and exported as a dried seafood product.

In particular, S. nudus is collected, cleaned of its innards, and eaten as a delicacy in the South Chinese provinces of Guangdong, Hainan, Guangxi, and Fujian. The worms are local delicacies in Beihai, Guangxi, where Běihǎi shāchóng (lit. "Beihai sandworm") and sold in dried form to be fried as a snack or braised as an ingredient for a soup stock. In Xiamen, Fujian, the species is called tǔsǔn (lit. "earth bamboo shoot") and is braised and allow to gel in the liquid as eaten as aspic   tǔsǔndòng) in local restaurants.

Sipunculus nudus is also collected on islands in the northern Vietnamese province of Quang Ninh where sá sùng (local pronunciation of ) is used as an ingredient for pho stock.

References

External links
Friday Fellow: Common Peanut Worm at Earthling Nature.
Introduction to Sipuncula

Sipunculans
Animals described in 1766
Taxa named by Carl Linnaeus